Frederick James Fairland Streetly, OBE (1879-1957)  was an Anglican priest in the mid Twentieth century.

Streetly was educated at Codrington College, Barbados and the University of Durham and ordained in 1916. After a curacy at Scarborough he was Rector of St Agnes, Port of Spain from 1932 to 1940; and then of St Paul, San Fernando until 1947. He was Archdeacon of Trinidad South from 1942 to 1947;  and then of Tobago from 1947.

He died in March 1952.

References

1879 births
1952 deaths
Alumni of Codrington College
Archdeacons of Tobago
Archdeacons of Trinidad, North and South
Trinidad and Tobago religious leaders